Ronald Raymond Rees (born 4 April 1944) is a former Welsh international footballer. He played predominantly as a winger and was able to play down either flank.

Rees was a graduate of the Coventry City youth team, and was given his debut for the senior team by Jimmy Hill in May 1962. Rees spent six years at Highfield Road, helping Coventry gain promotion from Division Three to Division One.

Rees left Coventry to join West Bromwich Albion for a fee of £65,000 in March 1968. He spent less than a year at the club, joining Nottingham Forest in February 1969 for £60,000.

Swansea City manager Roy Bentley paid Forest a club-record £26,000 for Rees in January 1972. Rees spent three-and-a-half seasons with Swansea before joining Haverfordwest of the League of Wales in August 1975.

Following his retirement from professional football, Rees worked at the Ford motorworks in Swansea and Bridgend. He was forced to retire in 1995, at the age of 51, after suffering a major stroke that took his ability to walk and talk. He is now a resident at Hengoed Court Care Home, Swansea.

Honours 
 Coventry City Hall of Fame

References

1944 births
Welsh footballers
Wales international footballers
Wales under-23 international footballers
Coventry City F.C. players
West Bromwich Albion F.C. players
Nottingham Forest F.C. players
Association football wingers
Swansea City A.F.C. players
Living people
Haverfordwest County A.F.C. players